Gari is a given name, nickname and surname. It may refer to:

 Gari Buruka (born 1997), Papua New Guinean woman cricketer
 Gari Cappelli (born 1961), Croatian politician and Minister of Tourism
 Gari Mea (born 1976), former Papua New Guinean woman cricketer
 Julius Garibaldi Gari Melchers (1860–1932), American painter
 Gari Moka (born 1983), Papua New Guinean footballer
 Gari Scott (born 1978), American former National Football League player
 Garikoitz Gari Uranga (born 1980), Spanish retired footballer
 Giulio Gari (1909–1994), Austro-Hungarian operatic tenor
 Roba Gari (born 1982), Ethiopian runner who specializes in the 3000-metre steeplechase

Hypocorisms